In film production, the pre-credit is the section of the film which is shown before the opening or closing credits are shown. 

Many films will by common convention have a short scene before the credits to introduce characters who may, or may not, become crucial to the film's plot. This sequence is normally an expositional scene with either an obvious important plot point or an event which is seemingly minor but whose significance will later in the film become apparent.

A characteristic of pre-credit scenes in the horror genre is a character (seemingly a main character) who is killed quickly, as a heralding "warning kill" of the antagonist. For example, Cube.

The James Bond franchise has become well known for elaborate high-concept pre-credit sequences, sometimes over ten minutes in length. 

Television series often have a pre-credit sequence, especially ones from the mid-1960s onward. (Such series as Captain Kangaroo, The Dick Van Dyke Show, The Andy Griffith Show, the first  incarnation of The Twilight Zone, I Love Lucy, and the Disney anthology television series did not.)  One series famous for its pre-credits is Law & Order. Their famous sound effect will close the pre-credit after each episode's victim is discovered.

See also
Cold open
Post-credits scene

Film and video terminology
Film production
Television terminology